Katherine Sims is an American politician who has served in the Vermont House of Representatives since 2021.

A resident of Craftsbury. Sims founded (2008) and was the Executive Director of Green Mountain Farm-to-School.

References

Living people
Yale College alumni
21st-century American politicians
21st-century American women politicians
Democratic Party members of the Vermont House of Representatives
Women state legislators in Vermont
Year of birth missing (living people)
People from Craftsbury, Vermont
People from Boston